The Tournament Capital Centre is a facility next to Thompson Rivers University's campus.  It hosts the Thompson Rivers WolfPack Basketball games. "The Fieldhouse consists of an indoor 6 lane, 200 metre track surrounding three NBA size basketball courts and seating for 2,200."

Tournament Capital Centre

References

Sports venues in Kamloops